Jaime Silvério Marques (1915 – 14 January 1986) was a Portuguese brigadier-general and colonial administrator.

Biography
Marques completed the Military engineering course at the Army School in 1940, shortly afterwards integrated in the Expeditionary Corps sent to the Azores. He had been mobilized for various service commissions in Azores, India, Macau and Angola. 

On 18 September 1959, he was appointed the Governor of Macau, replacing Pedro Correia de Barros. In February 1961, he designated Macau as a "permanent gaming religion", and officially positioned Macau as a low taxation region. Since then, gaming and tourism was regarded as Macau's major economic activities. He left office on 17 April 1962.

When on 25 April 1974 the Carnation Revolution broke out in Portugal, Marques joined the National Salvation Junta that took power. On 29 April, he was appointed Chief of Staff of the Army. On 30 September, he was removed from the National Salvation Junta together with Carlos Galvão de Melo and Manuel Diogo Neto, just after the resignation of António de Spínola.

In Macau, Avenue of Governor Jaime Silvério Marques (Avenida do Governador Jaime Silvério Marques, 馬濟時總督大馬路) was named after him.

References

External links
 "O Governador que mudou Macau: Jaime Silvério Marques". O Clarim, 8 de Junho de 2012 

1915 births
1986 deaths
Portuguese military officers
Governors of Macau
Portuguese colonial governors and administrators
Officers of the Order of Aviz
Commanders of the Order of Aviz